Martin James Shearman  (born 1965) is a British diplomat, who has served as the British Ambassador to Belgium since June 2019.

Early life 
Martin James Shearman was born in 1965.

Shearman attended The Skinners' School in Tunbridge Wells and Trinity College, Oxford.

Career 
Before his assignment in Belgium, Shearman was posted in New York where he was responsible for the UK's engagement with the United Nations on development, humanitarian and human rights issues with the rank of Ambassador.  He has also served as British High Commissioner to Uganda and Deputy High Commissioner to Nigeria.

Personal life 
Shearman is married to Miriam Shearman. They have two children.

References

External links 

 
 

High Commissioners of the United Kingdom to Uganda
Ambassadors of the United Kingdom to Belgium
People educated at The Skinners' School
Alumni of Trinity College, Oxford
Living people
1965 births